Mark Richard Jerrum (born 1955) is a British computer scientist and computational theorist.

Jerrum received his Ph.D. in computer science 'On the complexity of evaluating multivariate polynomials' in 1981 from University of Edinburgh under the supervision of Leslie Valiant. He is professor of pure mathematics at Queen Mary, University of London.

With his student Alistair Sinclair, Jerrum investigated the mixing behaviour of Markov chains to construct approximation algorithms for counting problems such as the computing the permanent, with applications in diverse fields such as matching algorithms, geometric algorithms, mathematical programming, statistics, physics-inspired applications, and dynamical systems. This work has been highly influential in theoretical computer science and was recognised with the Gödel Prize in 1996. A refinement of these methods led to a fully polynomial-time randomised approximation algorithm for computing the permanent, for which Jerrum and his co-authors received the Fulkerson Prize in 2006.

References

Select publications
 Frieze, A., Jerrum, M., Molloy M., Robinson, R., & Wormald, N. (1996). Generating and counting Hamilton cycles in random regular graphs. Journal of Algorithms, 21, 176–198.

External links
 Mark Jerrum home page at Queen Mary, University of London
 

1955 births
Living people
Alumni of the University of Edinburgh
British computer scientists
Theoretical computer scientists
Academics of Queen Mary University of London
Gödel Prize laureates